Sándor Bodó (born November 25, 1963) is a Hungarian politician, member of the National Assembly (MP) for Püspökladány, Hajdú-Bihar County (Constituency VI) from 2011 to 2014, and for Hajdúszoboszló (Hajdú-Bihar County Constituency V) since 2014. He served as President of the General Assembly of Hajdú-Bihar County from 2011 to 2014.

Sándor Arnóth, the MP (and mayor) for Püspökladány (Hajdú-Bihar County Constituency VI) died in a car accident on March 16, 2011. At the third round of the by-election on October 16, 2011 Bodó was elected with 51% of the vote before István Rigán (Jobbik), Ildikó Bangó (MSZP) and Róbert Bányász (SZU). He became a member of the Committee on Audit Office and Budget. From March 5, 2012 he worked in the Committee on Education, Science and Research. He was appointed a member of the Committee on Budgets in May 2014.

Bodó was appointed Secretary of State for Employment Policy and Corporate Relations on 13 June 2018, replacing Péter Cseresnyés.

Personal life
He is married. His wife is Edit Bodóné Madar. They have a daughter, Sára and a son, Bence.

References

1963 births
Living people
Fidesz politicians
Members of the National Assembly of Hungary (2010–2014)
Members of the National Assembly of Hungary (2014–2018)
Members of the National Assembly of Hungary (2018–2022)
Members of the National Assembly of Hungary (2022–2026)
People from Püspökladány